The 2017 Thai League Cup is the 8th season in the second era of a Thailand's knockout football competition. All games are played as a single match. It was sponsored by Toyota, and known as the Toyota League Cup for sponsorship purposes. 71 clubs were accepted into the tournament, and it began with the first qualification round on 1 March 2017, and concluded with the final on 22 November 2017. The tournament has been readmitted back into Thai football after a 10-year absence. The prize money for this prestigious award is said to be around 5 million baht and the runners-up will be netting 1 million baht.

The prize money is not the only benefit of this cup, the team winning the fair play spot will get a Hilux Vigo. The MVP of the competition will get a Toyota Camry Hybrid Car. The winner would have qualified for the 2017 Mekong Club Championship final.

This is the first edition of the competition and the qualifying round will be played in regions featuring clubs from the Thai League 3 and Thai League 4.

Calendar

Results

First qualification round
There were fourteen clubs from 2017 Thai League 3 and twenty-five clubs from 2017 Thai League 4 have signed to qualifying in 2017 Thai League cup. Qualification round had drawn on 22 February 2017 by FA Thailand.

Upper region
The qualifying round will be played in regions featuring clubs from the 2017 Thai League 4 Northern Region, 2017 Thai League 4 North Eastern Region, some of 2017 Thai League 4 Bangkok Metropolitan Region, and 2017 Thai League 3 Upper Region.

Lower region
The qualifying round will be played in regions featuring clubs from the some of 2017 Thai League 4 Bangkok Metropolitan Region, 2017 Thai League 4 Eastern Region, 2017 Thai League 4 Western Region, 2017 Thai League 4 Southern Region, some of 2017 Thai League 3 Upper Region, and 2017 Thai League 3 Lower Region.

Second qualification round
The second qualifying round will be featured by nineteen clubs which were the winners of first qualification round and Phrae United, a club from 2017 Thai League 3.

Upper region
The qualifying round will be played in regions featuring clubs from the 2017 Thai League 4 Northern Region, 2017 Thai League 4 North Eastern Region, some of 2017 Thai League 4 Bangkok Metropolitan Region, and 2017 Thai League 3 Upper Region.

Lower region
The qualifying round will be played in regions featuring clubs from the some of 2017 Thai League 4 Bangkok Metropolitan Region, 2017 Thai League 4 Eastern Region, 2017 Thai League 4 Western Region, 2017 Thai League 4 Southern Region, some of 2017 Thai League 3 Upper Region, and 2017 Thai League 3 Lower Region.

Qualification play-off round
The qualifying play-off round will be featured by six clubs which were the winners of second qualification round and fourteen clubs from 2017 Thai League 2. Qualification play-off round had drawn on 4 April 2017 by FA Thailand. Angthong, Songkhla United, Trat and Nakhon Pathom United withdrew. Kalasin, Samut Prakan United, Kamphaengphet and Ayutthaya United was drawn to qualify to First round.

First round
The first round will be featured by ten clubs which were the winners of the qualification play-off round, 4 clubs which were the winners of the second qualification round, and eighteen clubs from 2017 Thai League. First round had drawn on 27 June 2017 by FA Thailand.

Second round
The second round will be featured by sixteen clubs which were the winners of the first round, including eleven clubs from T1 and five clubs from T2. Second round had drawn on 9 August 2017 by FA Thailand.

Quarter-finals
The quarter-finals round will be featured by eight clubs which were the winners of the second round, including seven clubs from T1 and one club from T2. Quarter-finals round had drawn on 5 October 2017 by FA Thailand.

Semi-finals
The semi-finals round will be featured by four clubs which were the winners of the quarter-finals round, all of them were the clubs from T1. Semi-finals round had drawn on 17 October 2017 by FA Thailand.

Final

The final will be featured by the winners of the semi-finals round, both were the clubs from T1. A match of this round was held on 22 November 2017.

Top goalscorers
As of 22 November 2017 from official website.

See also
 2017 Thai League
 2017 Thai League 2
 2017 Thai League 3
 2017 Thai League 4
 2017 Thailand Amateur League
 2017 Thai FA Cup
 2017 Thailand Champions Cup

References

 Thai league cup snapshot from Thai League official website.
 Official Thai league cup rule from FA Thailand official website.
 http://www.smmsport.com/reader.php?news=196123
 http://www.thaileague.co.th/official/?r=Tournament/LeagueCup&iSeason=2

2017 in Thai football cups
Thailand League Cup
Thailand League Cup
2017
2017